William Couper may refer to:

 William Couper (bishop) (1568–1619), Scottish bishop and theologian
 William Couper (sculptor) (1853–1942), American sculptor
 William Couper (naturalist) (fl. 1850s–1886), American entomologist and naturalist

See also
 William Cooper (disambiguation)
 William Cowper (disambiguation)